Federal Bureau of Investigation Special Agent Dale Bartholomew Cooper, portrayed by Kyle MacLachlan, is a fictional character who is the protagonist of the ABC television series Twin Peaks and its 2017 revival series by Showtime. He also plays a supporting role in the prequel film Twin Peaks: Fire Walk with Me.

An eccentric FBI agent, Cooper arrives in Twin Peaks in 1989 to investigate the brutal murder of popular high school student Laura Palmer.

Concept and characteristics 
Creator David Lynch named Cooper in reference to D. B. Cooper, the pseudonym of an unidentified man who hijacked a Boeing 727 aircraft on November 24, 1971.

MacLachlan has stated that he views Cooper as an older version of his character in Blue Velvet (1986), a previous David Lynch collaboration. "I see my character as Jeffrey Beaumont grown up. Instead of being acted upon, he has command on the world." Lynch has stated Cooper's character was developed as "a grown-up Jeffrey Beaumont".

Cooper displays an array of quirky mannerisms such as giving a "thumbs up" when satisfied, sage-like sayings, and distinctive sense of humor along with his love for a good cherry pie and a "damn fine cup of coffee" which he takes black. One of his most popular habits is recording spoken-word tapes to a mysterious woman called "Diane" into his microcassette recorder that he always carries with him, that often contain everyday observations and thoughts on his current case.

In an interview with Scouting Magazine, Lynch said that Cooper is likely an Eagle Scout, the highest rank of the Boy Scouts of America (which incidentally Lynch also holds), and that this is the root of Cooper's courteous yet determined nature and natural leadership skills. In the same interview, Lynch said that Sheriff Harry S. Truman was probably also a scout as a child, yet one that only made it to the rank of Life Scout, Scouting's second-highest rank.

Appearances

In television

Twin Peaks
Born on April 19, 1954, Dale Cooper is a graduate of Germantown Friends School and Haverford College. He is quirky and intellectual, with a profound interest in the mystical, particularly in Tibet and Native American mythology. Much of his work is based on intuition and even dreams. On joining the Federal Bureau of Investigation, Cooper was based at the Bureau offices in Philadelphia. It was here that Cooper was partnered with the older Windom Earle (Kenneth Welsh). At some point, Cooper would be placed under the authority of FBI Chief Gordon Cole (David Lynch), which sometimes meant being handed the mysterious 'Blue Rose' cases. Some time after Cooper joined the Bureau, Earle's wife, Caroline, was a witness to a federal crime. Earle and Cooper were assigned to protect her, and it was around this time that Cooper began an affair with Caroline. However, one night, while in Pittsburgh, Cooper let his guard down, and Earle murdered Caroline in a jealous rage. Earle was subsequently sent to a mental institution. Cooper was devastated by the loss of the woman he would later refer to as the love of his life, and swore to never again get involved with someone who was a part of a case to which he was assigned.

Three years before his arrival in Twin Peaks, Cooper has a dream involving the plight of the Tibetan people, which also reveals to him the deductive technique of the Tibetan method. Deeply moved by what he saw in this dream, this event forms the basis of his unconventional methods of investigation. Cooper reveals to his boss, Cole, of the portents of a strange dream.

On February 24, 1989, Cooper comes to the town of Twin Peaks to investigate the murder of Laura Palmer (Sheryl Lee). Initially, the prime suspect is Laura's boyfriend Bobby Briggs (Dana Ashbrook), but Cooper quickly determines he is innocent. Cooper meets Phillip Gerard (Al Strobel), a shoe salesman who is possessed by an evil spirit called MIKE; MIKE tells him that another demon, BOB (Frank Silva), is the key to solving Laura's murder. Eventually, Cooper deduces that Laura's father, Leland (Ray Wise), murdered her while possessed by BOB. When BOB forces Leland to commit suicide, Cooper helps him transition into the afterlife by reciting a Buddhist prayer for the dead.

Cooper helps the Twin Peaks Sheriff's Department in investigating other cases as well, even during a brief suspension from the FBI. While in Twin Peaks, he learns of the mysterious places called the Black Lodge and the White Lodge and the various spirits inhabiting them, including MIKE and The Man From Another Place (Michael J. Anderson). He also resolves to protect the town from Earle, who has become a serial killer.

In the final episode of Twin Peaks, Cooper enters the Black Lodge to rescue his new girlfriend, Annie Blackburn (Heather Graham), from Earle. In the Black Lodge, he encounters his evil doppelgänger, who is in league with BOB. Earle appears and says he will let Annie go if Cooper gives him his soul. Cooper agrees, and Earle stabs him in the stomach. Seconds later, BOB appears and reverses time in the Lodge. BOB tells Cooper that Earle cannot ask for his soul, and then kills Earle and takes his soul. BOB then turns on Cooper, who flees, pursued by BOB and Cooper's doppelgänger. BOB allows Cooper's doppelgänger to leave the Black Lodge, while Cooper remains there. In the show's final scene, the doppelgänger smashes Cooper's head into a mirror and starts laughing hysterically; BOB's face looks back at him in the broken mirror.

2017 revival
Twenty-five years after the events of the original series, Cooper remains trapped in the Black Lodge, while his doppelgänger continues to assume his identity in the natural realm. With help from entities both inside and outside of the Black Lodge, as well as Diane (Laura Dern) in her Naido form, Cooper is finally able to leave. Due to outside interference, however, Cooper replaces Douglas "Dougie" Jones, a Las Vegas insurance agent, instead of his doppelgänger. Upon his return to the natural realm, he is left in a near-catatonic state, unable to perform basic tasks without assistance and rarely speaking besides repeating words he hears. Only slight traces of Cooper's personality appear, such as his passion for coffee and cherry pie. Cooper also becomes the target of an assassination plot organized by corrupt businessman Duncan Todd (Patrick Fischler) on orders from his doppelgänger.

The attempts on Cooper's life fail, partly through circumstance and assistance from MIKE and The Man From Another Place. Assistance from supernatural forces also leads to Cooper inadvertently obtaining money to pay off Dougie's debt to loan sharks, exposing a ring of corruption in Dougie's office, improving Dougie's relationship with his wife Janey-E (Naomi Watts) and boss Bushnell Mullins (Don Murray), and winning over the favor of the Mitchum brothers, Rodney (Robert Knepper) and Bradley (James Belushi), the gangsters who own the local casino.

Cooper eventually starts to come out of his near-catatonic state after hearing Gordon Cole's name spoken while watching the film Sunset Boulevard. The reference to his boss' name prompts Cooper to stick a fork into an electrical socket, electrocuting himself, and initially putting him into a coma. Upon awakening, however, Cooper returns with his senses intact and with the assistance of the Mitchum brothers, he heads back to Twin Peaks.

Although Cooper is unable to arrive at the Twin Peaks sheriff's station before his doppelgänger, the doppelgänger is killed by Lucy Brennan (Kimmy Robertson) and BOB is destroyed by Freddie Skyes (Jake Wardle), allowing Cooper to return his doppelgänger's spirit to the Black Lodge. He also reunites with Diane, freeing her from her Naido form. With BOB and the doppelgänger defeated, he then visits Phillip Jeffries (Nathan Frizzell), who sends him to the night of Laura Palmer's death. Cooper is successful in preventing her murder, but while leading Laura to the Fireman's (Carel Struycken) realm, she abruptly disappears.

Using information given him by the Fireman, Cooper travels to Odessa in search of Laura, initially accompanied by Diane. He eventually finds a woman who resembles an older Laura, but identifies herself as Carrie Page (Lee). Nevertheless, certain that she is Laura, Cooper convinces her to travel to Twin Peaks to reunite with Sarah Palmer at her household. Upon arriving at the Palmer household, however, Cooper discovers that the house is occupied by a different family. As Cooper asks what year he is in, Carrie hears Sarah shouting Laura's name, causing her to scream and the lights in the house to go out. The series then ends with an image of Laura whispering into Cooper's ear.

In film
The feature film Twin Peaks: Fire Walk with Me subtly expands on the events of Cooper's fate in the series finale, while at the same time functioning as a prequel that details the last week of Laura Palmer's life. At one point while experiencing a strange dream involving the Black Lodge and its residents, in the non-linear realm Laura encounters Cooper at a point after he has become trapped there. Cooper implores her not to take "the ring," a mysterious object that gives its wearer a sort of connection to the Black Lodge. Shortly thereafter, Laura also has a vision of a bloody Annie Blackburn beside her in her bed, who tells her: "My name is Annie. I've been with Dale and Laura. The good Dale is in the Lodge, and he can't leave. Write it in your diary."

A year prior to Laura's murder, Cooper witnesses missing FBI Agent Phillip Jeffries (David Bowie) appear in Cole's office before mysteriously disappearing again. He then investigates the disappearance of Agent Chester Desmond (Chris Isaak), who went missing while tasked with solving the murder of Teresa Banks (Pamela Gidley), but finds only the words "Let's Rock" written on the windshield of Desmond's car. Later, Cooper confides in Agent Albert Rosenfield (Miguel Ferrer) that he suspects Teresa's murderer will strike again, correctly describing Laura as the killer's next victim, but Rosenfield dismisses Cooper's prediction.

At the film's conclusion, Cooper appears in the Red Room beside Laura's spirit, smiling and comforting her.

In literature
During the second season of Twin Peaks, Simon & Schuster's Pocket Books division released several official tie-in publications, each written either by its creators or members of their family, which offer a wealth of character back-stories; Cooper's, in two such publications, is one of the best-developed of these back-stories.

Many of the details of Cooper's history as previously cited are drawn from a book that writer Mark Frost's brother Scott Frost wrote as a companion to the series, titled The Autobiography of F.B.I. Special Agent Dale Cooper: My Life, My Tapes.

Early in the second season of Twin Peaks, Simon & Schuster Audio released Diane ... The Twin Peaks Tapes of Agent Cooper, a cassette-only release that Kyle MacLachlan also performed. The tape consists of newly recorded messages from Cooper to his (then) never-seen assistant, Diane, mixed in with monologues from the original broadcasts. The tape begins with a prologue monologue in which Cooper discusses his pending trip to Twin Peaks, continues with the initial monologue heard in the pilot, and continues to a point after his recovery from being shot. For his work on this release, MacLachlan was nominated for a Grammy Award for best spoken-word performance.

In popular culture
When Kyle MacLachlan guest hosted Saturday Night Live in 1990 at the height of Twin Peaks popularity, the episode contained many references to the series throughout. Also featured was a sketch parodying the show and in particular Dale Cooper. Cooper is portrayed in the sketch as being extremely attentive to detail in his messages to Diane, including informing her of how many hairs he found in his shower the night before. Sheriff Harry S. Truman (Kevin Nealon) then visits Cooper, telling him that Leo Johnson (Chris Farley) has confessed to the murder of Laura Palmer and that he can go home. Cooper raises concerns that the investigations may not be over because he had a dream last night in which "A hairless mouse with a pitchfork sang a song about caves." He discards Leo's confession in spite of the overwhelming evidence against him. He is then visited by several Twin Peaks residents all played by SNL cast members: Audrey Horne, played by Victoria Jackson, who gives Cooper a going away gift and ties the ribbon with her tongue; Leland Palmer, played by Phil Hartman, who requests that Cooper dance with him; Nadine Hurley (Jan Hooks), who wants Cooper to take her silent drape runners to the patent office; The Log Lady, also played by Hooks, following Truman's observation that there were only two female SNL cast members; and finally Leo in custody of Deputy Andy Brennan (Conan O'Brien). Cooper protests that the case can't be over so soon and insists in vain that he and Truman perform several pointless tasks in order to aid him in the already solved investigation, including going to a graveyard at midnight disguised as altar boys. As everyone begins to leave, Cooper declares that they can't leave because they still don't know who shot him at the end of Season One. Leo, however, confesses to shooting Cooper, adding that Cooper himself saw him do it. Cooper reluctantly goes to sleep as The Man from Another Place (Mike Myers) begins to dance at the foot of his bed.

Relationships
Upon his arrival in Twin Peaks, Cooper is enchanted with the place and forms an instant rapport with many of the townspeople - most particularly Sheriff Harry S. Truman and his deputies, Deputy Tommy "Hawk" Hill and Deputy Andy Brennan (Harry Goaz). While Truman is initially skeptical of Cooper's unconventional investigation methods and other-worldly ideas, he is most often willing to accept Cooper's judgment. Over time, a deep bond emerges between the two; Truman even deputizes Cooper during the latter's brief suspension from the FBI.

Cooper's strongest relationship outside of the townspeople is that of his friendship with his colleague, Agent Albert Rosenfield. Though he has strong respect and admiration for Rosenfield's medical skills, and is seemingly not intimidated by Rosenfield's sarcastic manner, he has little tolerance or patience for Rosenfield's treatment of the town's citizens - most particularly his animosity towards Sheriff Truman.

Prior to Twin Peaks, Cooper's strongest romantic relationship was his affair with Caroline Earle, the wife of his former partner, Windom Earle. Caroline had been under Cooper and Earle's protection for witnessing a federal crime Earle committed when he lost his mind, but on one night when Cooper's guard was down, Caroline was murdered by Windom. Caroline's death and his failure to protect her continues to haunt Cooper on his arrival to Twin Peaks, referring to a "broken heart" when discussing women with Truman and his deputies.

On arrival to Twin Peaks, Cooper becomes quickly aware that 18-year-old Audrey Horne (Sherilyn Fenn), the daughter of local businessman Benjamin Horne (Richard Beymer), has a crush on him. Cooper is clearly attracted to Audrey, but he is quick to rebuff her advances when she turns up in his hotel bed. Cooper explains she is too young, but he does genuinely want to be her friend. Following her rescue, there remains a close and affectionate friendship with the two, most notably when Audrey arrives to his hotel room for comfort following her father's arrest and her sad farewell when she believes Cooper is leaving Twin Peaks for good. Audrey later gives Cooper a kiss when she discovers evidence that clears him of drug charges, and they later dance at the Milford wedding.

Following his reinstatement to the FBI, Cooper meets Annie Blackburn, the sister of Norma Jennings (Peggy Lipton), and falls in love with her. Annie is established as being a kindred spirit, experiencing the world with curiosity and wonder. Much like Cooper's pain over Caroline Earle, Annie also nurses a broken heart from someone in her past. Cooper helps her to prepare for participation in the Miss Twin Peaks contest. However, during the contest she is kidnapped by Earle, who takes her to the Black Lodge and uses her fear to open the gateway.

References

External links

 Agent Cooper Twin Peaks card
 Twin Peaks Saturday Night Live Sketch

Twin Peaks characters
Fictional special agents of the Federal Bureau of Investigation
Fictional occult and psychic detectives
Television characters introduced in 1990
Fictional characters from Philadelphia
Time travelers
Fictional Buddhists
American male characters in television